Boongaree Island is located off the Kimberley coast of Western Australia. 

The island is located in the southern end of the Bonaparte Archipelago in the north western part of Prince Frederick Harbour at the southern end of York Sound. It is one of a number of islands lying in the harbour.

The traditional owners of the area are the Uunguu peoples of the Wunambal language group, whose name for the island is Wunundarra or Bunjinii.

The area was surveyed in 1820 by Philip Parker King aboard . King named the island after the Indigenous Australian man, Boongaree, who was travelling aboard the vessel.

Fauna found on the island include the monjon, the northern quoll, the scaly-tailed possum and the northern leaf-nosed bat.

References 

Islands of the Kimberley (Western Australia)